Jean-Paul Savignac is a translator of Latin, Greek, and Gaulish. He has written three papers on the Gaulish language. He has also written a French-Gaulish dictionary.

Bibliography
 Œuvres complètes de Pindare (traduction), 1990. Réédition Collection Minos.
 Les Gaulois. Leurs écrits retrouvés, rassemblés, traduits et commentés. "Merde à César". "Cecos ac Caesar", Paris, éditions de la Différence, 1994 (2nd ed. 2000).
 Le chant de l'initié et autres poèmes gaulois, Paris, éditions de la Différence, 2000.
 Oracles de Delphes, Paris, éditions de la Différence, 2002.
 Eschyle, Prométhée enchainé (translation), Belin, 2004.
 Dictionnaire français-gaulois, Paris, éditions de la Différence, 2004.
 Le Mythe antique : Pourpre et ors, Paris, éditions de la Différence, 2006
 Bellina la Guerrière et l'oracle de Lutèce, Paris, Fayard, 2009
 Alésia, Paris, éditions de la Différence, 2012.

References

Gaulish language
French Latinists
Celtic studies scholars
French male non-fiction writers
French translators